The Sharp IS01 is a smartbook device from Sharp released in 2010.

History 
It started shipping in June 2010.

It was never released in the United States.

Specifications 
 1GHZ Qualcomm SoC
 Android 1.6
 5" touchscreen

Reception 
The Sharp IS01 was not well received in a review by Engadget.

References

External links 

 Picture of the Sharp IS01
Official website

Smartbooks